Kambove is a town in the Haut-Katanga Province of the Democratic Republic of the Congo. 

Kambove lies at an altitude of 4783 ft (1457 m).  Economic activity in the area includes cobalt processing.
Kambove is the center of the Kambove mines region.
Gécamines, a state-owned mining company, owns the Kamoya central, Kamoya south, Shangolowe and Kamfundwa mines.
Ore from these mines is transported to the concentrator at Kambove for extraction of copper and cobalt.

Climate
Kambove has a humid subtropical climate (Köppen: Cwa).

Notable births 

Cécile Kyenge an Italian minister of Letta Cabinet was born in Kambove.

References 

Populated places in Haut-Katanga Province